JDS Takashio (SS-571) was the sixth boat of thes. She was commissioned on 30 January 1976.

Construction and career 
Takashio was laid down at Mitsubishi Heavy Industries Kobe Shipyard on 6 July 1973 and launched on 30 June 1975. She was commissioned on 30 January 1976, into the 1st Submarine Group.

On March 7, 1978, the 6th Submarine was newly formed under the 1st Submarine Group, and was incorporated with JDS Yaeshio commissioned on the same day.

She participated in Hawaii dispatch training from August 18 to November 16, 1979.

She participated in Hawaii dispatch training from January 18 to April 19, 1984.

On July 6, 1992, she was reclassified as an auxiliary submarine, her hull number was number changed to ATSS-8004, and she became a ship under the direct control of the 1st Submarine Group.

She was decommissioned on 26 July 1995.

Citations 

1975 ships
Uzushio-class submarines
Ships built by Mitsubishi Heavy Industries